Spring Lake is a lake in Waushara County, Wisconsin, in the United States.

Spring Lake was named from the many springs which flow into the lake.

See also
List of lakes in Wisconsin

References

Lakes of Wisconsin
Lakes of Waushara County, Wisconsin